Reginald Goodacre (24 July 1908 – 28 September 1998) was an English footballer who played as a right-back in the Football League for West Ham United and Mansfield Town.

Goodacre played non-league football with Boston Town before joining West Ham United for the 1930–31 season. His first game came against Manchester United on 14 February 1931, along with fellow debutant Joe Musgrave. He spent three seasons at Upton Park, the first two in the First Division where he made 16 appearances.

In 1932–33, he made a further four appearances for West Ham in the Second Division before leaving for Mansfield Town. There, he made 18 appearances in 1933–34, scoring one goal.

He then joined Midland League club Peterborough United and made 35 appearances in 1934–35.

After a short spell at Chesterfield, where he made no competitive appearances, he joined Gainsborough Trinity.

He was a cousin of professional footballers Eric Houghton and Roy Houghton.

References

1908 births
1998 deaths
People from Billingborough
Footballers from Lincolnshire
English footballers
Association football fullbacks
Lincoln City F.C. players
Boston Town F.C. (1920s) players
West Ham United F.C. players
Mansfield Town F.C. players
Peterborough United F.C. players
Gainsborough Trinity F.C. players
English Football League players